Kent Cheng Jak-si (born 22 May 1951) is a Hong Kong film and television actor. He is a two time recipient of the best actor award at the Hong Kong Film Awards.

Biography
Cheng was born in a poor family in Hong Kong. He intended to be an actor when he was a child, written on his comprehension. However, the comprehension was seriously criticised by his teacher.

Cheng joined a film company in 1972, but he could not gain any position in that film company, until joining TVB in 1976. Since then he became an actor for several TV dramas.

In the 1980s he changed his focus in acting in films and directing. In 1985 he won the Best Actor award in the Hong Kong Film Awards for his role in the film called Why Me?. Cheng won again in 1996.

Cheng opened a film company in the 1990s, but failed and struggled through financial problems during the late 1990s. He thus returned to be an actor for TVB in 1993. However, Cheng could not gain a leading role, so he decided to turn to ATV in 1997.

In recent years he focused in mainland China. In 2006 he returned to TVB.

Filmography

Film

Television

References

External links

loveHKfilm entry

 

1951 births
Hong Kong male television actors
Hong Kong male film actors
Hong Kong film directors
Living people
20th-century Hong Kong male actors
21st-century Hong Kong male actors
Golden Bauhinia Awards - Best Actor